Whitworth Sharpshooters were the Confederates' answer to the Union sharpshooter regiments, and they used the British Whitworth rifle. These men accompanied regular infantrymen and their occupation was usually eliminating Union artillery gun crews.

Whitworth rifle
The Whitworth rifle proved to be an accurate and deadly instrument. Its most remembered act was on May 9, 1864 at the Battle of Spotsylvania Court House, where Union General John Sedgwick urged his men to leave a ditch in which they lay in order to cover from the Confederate snipers hidden 800 to 1000 yards away. According to Martin T. McMahon, Brevet Major-General, U.S.V. [Chief-of-Staff, Sixth Corps], he and General Sedgwick were walking along the line when he [Sedgwick] noticed a soldier dodging a near-passing bullet, and said to him "What? Men dodging this way for single bullets? What will you do when they open fire along the whole line? I am ashamed of you. I'm ashamed of you, dodging that way. They couldn't hit an elephant at this distance." Seconds later he fell forward with a bullet hole below his left eye.

Notes

References

Military units and formations of the Confederate States Army
Sharpshooter units and formations of the American Civil War